FR Yugoslavia competed at the 1997 Mediterranean Games held in Bari, Italy.

Medals by sport

List of Medalists

References
 Olympic Committee of Serbia - 1997 Mediterranean Games

Nations at the 1997 Mediterranean Games
1997
Yugoslavia at the Mediterranean Games